The Chinese Olympic Committee (IOC code: CHN) has been the officially designated body of the People's Republic of China (PRC) regarding the Olympic Games and other affiliated international sport federations since 1979, when the Nagoya Resolution was adopted by the International Olympic Committee (IOC).

Leaders

Timeline concerning Olympic recognition
The following timeline concerns the different names and principle events concerning recognition of the ROC Olympic team:

1910: The "Chinese National Olympic Committee" is created to represent China's interests in Olympic Games activities.
1922: The IOC recognized this CNO.
1932: ROC competes in the Olympics for the first time as "China"
1951: The Chinese National Olympic Committee moves from Nanking to Taipei;
1951: The PRC Chinese National Olympic Committee is organized;
1952: The PRC Chinese National Olympic Committee is invited to the Olympics for the first time, during the 1952 Summer Olympics in Helsinki. Only one athlete, Wu Chuanyu, a swimmer, was able to participate, given that the Committee "was accepted for affiliation a mere two days before the opening of the Games".
1954: The IOC adopts a resolution officially recognizing the People's Republic of China (PRC) "Chinese Olympic Committee". The PRC is invited to the Melbourne Games, and thusly organizes a delegation, but withdraws in protest of the two China's issue;
1958: PRC withdraws from the Olympic movement and from the federations governing Olympic sports. Professor Tung Hou Yi, an IOC member for the PRC resigns;
1979: The IOC officially recognizes the PRC Chinese Olympic Committee as the representative body for "China" under Communist rule. The ROC Chinese Olympic Committee is officially renamed the "Chinese Taipei Olympic Committee".

See also
China at the Olympics
China at the Asian Games
List of current leaders of the Chinese Olympic Committee
Sports Federation and Olympic Committee of Hong Kong, China
Macau Sports and Olympic Committee
Chinese Taipei Olympic Committee

References
Berlioux, Monique, "Concerning China", Olympic Review, No. 66-67 p. 171-174, 1973 May–June. https://web.archive.org/web/20100809032424/http://www.la84foundation.org/OlympicInformationCenter/OlympicReview/1973/ore66/ore66c.pdf, retrieved on 2008-08-24

External links
Official website 

China
China at the Olympics
Oly
1951 establishments in China
Sports organizations established in 1951